Edham Nurredin Husic (born 3 February 1970), commonly known as Ed Husic, is an Australian politician serving as Minister for Industry and Science since 2022. Husic is a member of the Australian House of Representatives, elected to represent the seat of Chifley in western Sydney for the Australian Labor Party at the 2010 federal election. He is the first Muslim to be elected to federal parliament, as well as the first Muslim to be made a Minister in the Australian Government.

Early life and education
Husic was born in Sydney, the son of Bosnian Muslim (known as Bosniaks) immigrants who came to Australia in the late 1960s. His father, Hasib Husić, a welder, worked on iconic projects undertaken by the Chifley government such as the Snowy Mountains Scheme. His mother, Hasiba, was a housewife.
 
Husic says that while growing up, his household practised Islam but also celebrated Christmas and Easter. As a child Husic did not attend the mosque, but later in life took a deeper interest in Islam.  After 9/11, Husic described himself as "non-practising" Muslim, in order to "make people feel more comfortable." He later regretted calling himself non-practising. Husic has said he spoke Bosnian at home, picking it up during his primary school years.

Husic was raised in Western Sydney and was educated at Blacktown South Public School, Mitchell High School and the University of Western Sydney, where he graduated with a Bachelor of Arts in Applied Communications.

Early career and union involvement
In the 1990s, Husic worked as a research officer for the member for Chifley, Roger Price. Husic was first elected as a branch organiser in 1997. In 1998, he was elected as vice-president of the Communications Division of the CEPU. From 1999 to 2003, he worked for Integral Energy as a communications manager. In July 2006, he became the secretary of the Communications Division of the Communications, Electrical and Plumbing Union of Australia (CEPU). He was the national president of the CEPU before being elected to federal parliament.

Political career

Preselection 
Husic unsuccessfully contested the federal seat of Greenway at the 2004 federal election, representing the Labor Party. Husic lost to Liberal candidate Louise Markus. During the election, anonymous campaigners distributed leaflets attacking Ed Husic for being a Muslim. There were also reports that voters were urged to vote for Louise Markus "because she's a Christian". The Labor Party accused the Liberal Party of orchestrating the leaflets, but the Liberal party denied that.

Following the decision by Roger Price not to run for re-election, Husic contested and won the safe Labor seat of Chifley in 2010.

Rudd-Gillard Governments 
When Kevin Rudd announced the Second Rudd Ministry in 2013, Husic became the first Muslim sworn onto the Australian federal government frontbench, as Parliamentary Secretary to the Prime Minister and Parliamentary Secretary for Broadband, taking his oath on the Quran.

Opposition 
During October 2020, Husic said his potential to be chosen by fellow Labor politicians for future party leadership rested with the Australian population moving beyond their concerns about Islam.

In March 2021, Husic's parliamentary speech critiqued the Coalition government's approach toward the Australian Muslim community through its use of the expression Islamic terrorism in relation to national security. Husic stated that several politicians preferred to overlook problems affecting conservatism and described concerns said by some conservative senators over the term right wing extremism as being "politically convenient". He supported ASIO substituting both expressions with other terminology. Husic said that he is against violent acts, and Muslims like him over the years have been often confronted by conservatives to denounce Islamist extremism.

Husic served as the Shadow Minister for the Digital Economy and the Shadow Minister for Human Services until 2019, when he resigned to make way for Kristina Keneally. Husic was added back to the shadow cabinet when Joel Fitzgibbon resigned as Shadow Minister for Agriculture and Resources, with Husic taking over the portfolio. After a shadow cabinet reshuffle, Husic became the Shadow Minister for Industry and Innovation in January 2021.

Husic's sister Sabina was Opposition Leader Anthony Albanese's deputy chief of staff between May 2019 and November 2020.

Albanese Government
After Labor's victory in the 2022 Australian federal election, Husic became the Minister for Industry and Science.

Political views 
Husic was the primary advocate for a parliamentary investigation into the "Australia Tax," the significant price difference for certain IT products compared to overseas markets.

Husic supports same-sex marriage, and is good friends with Josh Frydenberg.

References

 

 

1970 births
Australian Labor Party members of the Parliament of Australia
Labor Right politicians
Australian Muslims
Australian people of Bosnia and Herzegovina descent
Australian people of Bosniak descent
Living people
Members of the Australian House of Representatives
Members of the Australian House of Representatives for Chifley
Western Sydney University alumni
21st-century Australian politicians
Albanese Government